Torcy is a railway station in Torcy, Seine-et-Marne, a suburb east of Paris.

History
Torcy opened on 19 December 1980 as part of an extension of the A4 branch from its previous eastern terminal of Noisy-le-Grand–Mont d'Est. It served as the eastern terminus of the A4 branch for twelve years until 1 April 1992, when the RER A4 was extended to Marne-la-Vallée–Chessy; since then, the A4 branch has yet to be extended.

Traffic 
, the estimated annual attendance by the RATP Group was 4,223,220 passengers.

Service
Torcy is on the A4 branch of the RER A and receives frequent service. As of 4 February 2008, during peak hours there are between twelve and eighteen trains per hour (intervals of five and three minutes and twenty seconds), during mid-day trains arrive every ten minutes, and early mornings and late nights trains come at fifteen-minute intervals.

The station acts as a terminus for certain trains. Trains that terminate at Torcy will display a headline beginning with O, O being the designation that a train terminates at Torcy rather than Q for Marne-la-Vallée–Chessy.

Bus connections
The station is served by several buses:
 Pep's Bus network lines: 13, 21, 25, 29 and 46 ;
 Seine-et-Marne Express Bus network lines: 18 and 19 ;
 Stigo Bus network line: 18 ;
 Transdev Lys (by Setra) Bus network line: 100 ;

Gallery

References

Réseau Express Régional stations
Railway stations in France opened in 1980
Railway stations in Seine-et-Marne